KISY (92.7 FM, "Kiss FM") is a radio station broadcasting a top 40/CHR music format. Licensed to Blossom, Texas, United States, the station serves the Paris, Texas area. The station is owned by Tracy McCutchen.

References

External links

ISY
Contemporary hit radio stations in the United States